The cue sports competition at the 2005 World Games, including three-cushion billiards, nine-ball and snooker, took place from 20 to 24 July at the Saalbau Bottrop in Bottrop, Germany. 64 competitors, from 32 nations, participated in the tournament.

Participating nations

Medal table

Medals summary

References

 
2005 World Games
2005
World Games
Cue sports in Germany